Pierre Gouws (born 14 April 1960) is a Zimbabwean former cyclist. He competed in the road race at the 1988 Summer Olympics.

References

External links
 

1960 births
Living people
Zimbabwean male cyclists
Olympic cyclists of Zimbabwe
Cyclists at the 1988 Summer Olympics
Commonwealth Games competitors for Zimbabwe
Cyclists at the 1990 Commonwealth Games
Place of birth missing (living people)